Hermanni Vuorinen (born 27 January 1985) is a Finnish former footballer. He played as a striker.

Club career
He began his career at FC Jazz but at the age of 18, he tried out for German side Werder Bremen, but got homesick. For the 2005 season he joined FC Honka and helped them gain promotion to the Finnish Premier League (Veikkausliiga). Few thought that they would survive but at the end of September, the team was at the top of the league, receiving top-scoring from Vuorinen with 16 goals in 18 games.

Because of his success, it was announced in August 2006 that Fredrikstad FK had purchased the tall forward, turning down clubs from Italy, Germany, Switzerland and Slovenia. However, he returned to Finland in July 2007. On 31 August 2010 he was signed by R. Charleroi S.C. for a two-year contract with an option for third. He scored his first goal for Charleroi on 16 October 2010 in a 1–2 loss against Lokeren.

He returned to Honka in August 2012.

International career
On 18 January 2010 Vuorinen made his first appearance for the Finland national football team at Málaga, Spain in a friendly match against South Korea after Stuart Baxter decide to call him.

Honours

Fredrikstad FK

 Norwegian football cup: 1
2006

FC Honka

 Veikkausliiga Top Scorer: 16 goals
2006, 2009
 Finnish League Cup
2010

References

External links

  
 
 
 
 
 

1985 births
Sportspeople from Pori
Living people
Finnish footballers
Finland international footballers
FC Jazz players
Fredrikstad FK players
FC Honka players
R. Charleroi S.C. players
Eliteserien players
Belgian Pro League players
Challenger Pro League players
Finnish expatriate sportspeople in Germany
Expatriate footballers in Germany
Finnish expatriate sportspeople in Norway
Expatriate footballers in Norway
Finnish expatriate footballers
Association football forwards